The 1944 Connecticut Huskies football team represented the University of Connecticut in the 1944 college football season.  The Huskies were led by tenth-year head coach J. Orlean Christian and completed the season with a record of 7–1.  No team had been fielded in 1943, due to World War II.

Schedule

References

Connecticut
UConn Huskies football seasons
Connecticut Huskies football